John Junor (4 November 1855 – 12 October 1920) was a Scotland international rugby union player. He played as a Forward.

Rugby Union career

Amateur career

He played as a forward for Glasgow Academicals.

Provincial career

He represented Glasgow District against Edinburgh District in the last bi-annual match - until the introduction of the 1872 Cup format in the 21st century - of the 'inter-city' on 29 January 1876.

He also represented the West of Scotland District.

International career

He made 6 appearances for Scotland between 1876 and 1881.

References

1855 births
1920 deaths
Scottish rugby union players
Scotland international rugby union players
Rugby union forwards
Glasgow District (rugby union) players
Glasgow Academicals rugby union players
Rugby union players from Glasgow
West of Scotland District (rugby union) players
Blues Trial players